The Ghost of the B is a joke mainly used by sports fans in Latin America to fans of rival club in danger of descending into "B" Division.

The popularity of the character led to the inclusion of the mascot in a TV spot of Claudio Lozano for the 2013 elections in Argentina, this time as a joke for the candidate Daniel Filmus.

References

Argentine Internet celebrities